Mannar Mathai Speaking is a 1995 Indian Malayalam-language comedy thriller film produced and directed by Mani C. Kappan and written by Siddique-Lal. The stars Mukesh, Innocent, Sai Kumar, Vani Viswanath, Biju Menon, Geetha Vijayan, K. P. Ummer, Kaviyoor Ponnamma, Janardhanan, Indrans, Vijayaraghavan, Sukumari, Harisree Ashokan and Cochin Haneefa. It is a sequel to the 1989 film Ramji Rao Speaking, and is followed by Mannar Mathai Speaking 2 (2014). Vani Viswanath made her debut in this film as a leading actress.

The film was a commercial success. It is loosely based on the 1958 film Vertigo. Priyadarshan adapted certain subplots of the film for his Hindi film, Bhagam Bhag (2006), which went on to be remade in Telugu as Brahmanandam Drama Company. Writer Siddique later reused the story and tweaked it for his Tamil film Sadhu Miranda (2008) and Telugu film Maaro (2011).

Plot
Mannar Mathai is now running a drama group under Urvashi Theatres. The lead actors in this troupe, Gopalakrishnan and Balakrishnan, always fight with each other for the lead role in the drama. During Urvashi Theatres first stage show, Gopalakrishnan was given the villain role and was supposed to act as slapping the heroine Shakunthala, but he slaps her really hard. Shakunthala leaves the troupe accepting her invitation to act in a film.

The drama troupe soon faces trouble without a lead actress. Since Gopalakrishnan created all the trouble, he had to take up the responsibility to find an actress. All his efforts to find a lead actress go in vain. During the course of his search, while he was travelling in a taxi, a girl named "Meera" jumps in front of the car to commit suicide. Gopalakrishnan rescues her and brings her to the drama camp. When she regains consciousness, they make her the lead actress of the troupe. To get the role of the hero, Gopalakrishnan mocks her as his cousin, and she will only act if they make him the hero. Balakrishnan, however, does not readily believe in this and he brings Gopalakrishnan's mother to the camp to clarify. When the truth was about to come out, Gopalakrishnan tells his mother that he told everyone that she is his cousin because he is in love with her, and she asks him to marry her. With no way out, they marry in front of all.

After the marriage, Meera tries to commit suicide again by jumping into the well. She suffers an electric shock and loses consciousness. They all take her to the doctor where she regains consciousness. She then says that she does not remember anyone from the troupe and she is the wife of a wealthy businessman called Mahendra Varma. They inform this news to Mahendra Varma, and he takes her to his house. Later she calls Gopalakrishnan and says that she is going to commit suicide, and they all rush to Mahendra Varma's house. By the time they reach, she had lit herself, and they all could only watch her die.

After three months, when the troupe was in Mangalore, Balakrishnan happens to see Meera on the roadside. They are almost assaulted by a group of Muslim fanatics but they manages to escape. Meera reappears in their house, Mathai believes that she is a ghost and gets scared. She says them that she is not dead and her real name is Stella Fernandez and Meera was the name of Mahendra Varma's real wife who died that day. Stella tells that Meera didn't commit suicide but she was killed by Mahendra Varma and he had hired Stella who is a criminal and a robber who operates in many names and in many dress codes to act as Meera and to provide proof that she had suicidal tendencies. She met  Mahendra Varma in a jewellery shop where she got caught for stealing. She tried to save Meera but she couldn't. They tried to take revenge against Mahendra Varma and put him behind bars.

Mahendra Varma kidnaps Gopalakrishnan's mother and bargains with Gopalakrishnan to bring Stella to them. In the meantime, Ramji Rao also surfaces. He kidnaps Meera and bargains money. Now Gopalakrishnan is trapped in between two kidnappers, and he has to rescue both his mother and Stella. In the hilarious situations, Mathai gets the suitcase of money, drinking alcohol between the fight. Using their clever tactics, Gopalakrishnan and Balakrishnan manages rescues them both. Garvasees Aashan comes there with his to gang to break Gopalakrishnan's leg as a revenge of his leg been broken by Gopalakrishnan on the day when Stella jumped into his car. Gopalakrishnan fools him by telling they are practicing drama and he and his gang fights with Ramji Rao's and Mahendra Varma's gang. When Garvasees Aashan tries to break Gopalakrishnan's leg during the fight with Gopalakrishnan and Mahendra Varma, he accidentally hits Mahendra Varma and he falls off from the top of the building and everyone thinks he is dead, while his body falls on the truck driven by Ramji Rao, and he drives off.

Cast
 Mukesh as Gopalakrishnan
 Innocent as Mannar Mathai
 Sai Kumar as Balakrishnan
 Vani Viswanath as Meera Varma / Stella Fernandez
 Biju Menon as Mahendra Varma
 Vijayaraghavan as Ramji Rao (Guest Appearance)
 Janardhanan as Garvasees Aasan
 Cochin Haneefa as Eldho
 Sukumari as Gopalakrishnan's Mother
 K. P. Ummer as Prathapa Varma
 Kaviyoor Ponnamma as Meera's Mother
 Indrans as Driver Ponnappan
 Harisree Ashokan as Sandhyavu
 Prathapachandran as Doctor Unnithan
 Geetha Vijayan as Meera Varma (Original)
 Machan Varghese as Tea Velayudhankutty Eldho's Friend
 Priyanka Anoop as Shakunthala
 Kaduvakulam Antony as Booking Agent
 Kuttyedathi Vilasini as Sakunthala's Mother

Soundtrack 
The film's soundtrack contains 8 songs, all composed by S. P. Venkatesh, with lyrics by Bichu Thirumala.

Box office
The film became a commercial success.

References

External links
 

1990s Malayalam-language films
1995 comedy films
1995 films
Indian comedy films
Indian sequel films
Speaking2
Malayalam films remade in other languages